María José Sarmiento is an Argentine judge.

Biography
In 1997, during the government of Carlos Menem, she ruled against a rise in taxes for telephones. Other judges made similar rulings, which were ratified afterwards.

During 2002, she made many rulings that authorized people to access their money, held in the banks due to the corralito. By doing so she joined the line of judges that deemed the measure unconstitutional.

In 2007, she ordered Felisa Miceli, the Minister of Economy at the time, to answer to the Senate for an amount of money destined to the Greco group in a hidden manner.

In 2008, she considered that the blockade of the San Martín bridge by neighbours of the city, protesting against the placement of factories nearby, was illegal.

At the beginning of 2010, during a judicial break, she ruled against two decrees of President Cristina Fernández de Kirchner. She denied the use of Central Bank reserves for paying debt, and then ratified Martín Redrado as president of the bank.

References

External links
 Quién es la jueza que contrarió dos veces en el día al Gobierno 
 Conozca quién es la jueza María José Sarmiento 

Argentine women judges
Living people
20th-century births
Year of birth missing (living people)